Zheng Wushuang (born 29 November 1998) is a Chinese former tennis player.

She has a career-high WTA singles ranking of 430, achieved on 24 February 2020. On 9 September 2019, she peaked at No. 309 in the WTA doubles rankings.

On the ITF Junior Circuit, Zheng reached a combined career-high ranking of 13 in January 2016.

Zheng made her WTA Tour main-draw debut at the 2016 Jiangxi International Women's Tennis Open, where she received a wildcard into the singles draw.

ITF Circuit finals

Singles: 2 (2 titles)

Doubles: 10 (6 titles, 4 runner-ups)

External links
 
 

1998 births
Living people
Chinese female tennis players
21st-century Chinese women